XCB (X protocol C-language Binding) is a library implementing the client-side of the X11 display server protocol. XCB is written in the C programming language and distributed under the MIT License. The project was started in 2001 by Bart Massey and aims to replace Xlib.

Overview
XCB was designed as a smaller, modernized replacement for Xlib, previously the primary C library for communicating with the X window system, coinciding with a more complete overhaul of the X implementation that took place during the early 2000s. The main goals of XCB are to:
 reduce library size and complexity
 provide direct access to the X11 protocol

The required size reduction is achieved primarily by restricting XCB's scope to handling the X protocol and omitting Xlib functionality such as its extensive utility library, much of which saw little use by applications. This results in a factor thirty reduction of the compiled library size (as of 2004).
Secondary goals include making the C interface asynchronous, facilitating better multithreading and making it easier to implement extensions (via XML protocol descriptions).

The core and extension protocol descriptions are in XML, with a program written in Python creating the C bindings. (Previous versions used XSLT and M4.)

A further goal is to be able to use these protocol descriptions to create protocol documentation, more language bindings, and server-side stubs.

Massey and others have worked to prove key portions of XCB formally correct using Z notation. (Xlib has long been known to contain errors.)

Xlib compatibility
Xlib/XCB provides application binary interface compatibility with both Xlib and XCB, providing an incremental porting path. Xlib/XCB uses the protocol layer of Xlib, but replaces the Xlib transport layer with XCB, and provides access to the underlying XCB connection for direct use of XCB. Xlib/XCB allows an application to open a single connection to the X display server and use both XCB and Xlib, possibly through a mixture of libraries designed for one or the other.

Example
// Simple XCB application for opening a window and drawing a box in it

// To compile it using GNU, use:
// gcc x.c -lxcb

#include <stdio.h>
#include <stdlib.h>
#include <xcb/xcb.h>

int main(void)
{
  xcb_connection_t    *c;
  xcb_screen_t        *s;
  xcb_window_t         w;
  xcb_gcontext_t       g;
  xcb_generic_event_t *e;
  uint32_t             mask;
  uint32_t             values[2];
  int                  done = 0;
  xcb_rectangle_t      r = { 20, 20, 60, 60 };

  // open connection to the server
  c = xcb_connect(NULL,NULL);
  if (xcb_connection_has_error(c)) {
    printf("Cannot open display\n");
    exit(EXIT_FAILURE);
  }
  // get the first screen
  s = xcb_setup_roots_iterator( xcb_get_setup(c) ).data;

  // create black graphics context
  g = xcb_generate_id(c);
  w = s->root;
  mask = XCB_GC_FOREGROUND | XCB_GC_GRAPHICS_EXPOSURES;
  values[0] = s->black_pixel;
  values[1] = 0;
  xcb_create_gc(c, g, w, mask, values);

  // create window
  w = xcb_generate_id(c);
  mask = XCB_CW_BACK_PIXEL | XCB_CW_EVENT_MASK;
  values[0] = s->white_pixel;
  values[1] = XCB_EVENT_MASK_EXPOSURE | XCB_EVENT_MASK_KEY_PRESS;
  xcb_create_window(c, s->root_depth, w, s->root,
                    10, 10, 100, 100, 1,
                    XCB_WINDOW_CLASS_INPUT_OUTPUT, s->root_visual,
                    mask, values);

  // map (show) the window
  xcb_map_window(c, w);

  xcb_flush(c);

  // event loop
  while (!done && (e = xcb_wait_for_event(c))) {
    switch (e->response_type & ~0x80) {
    case XCB_EXPOSE:    // draw or redraw the window
      xcb_poly_fill_rectangle(c, w, g,  1, &r);
      xcb_flush(c);
      break;
    case XCB_KEY_PRESS:  // exit on key press
      done = 1;
      break;
    }
    free(e);
  }
  // close connection to server
  xcb_disconnect(c);

  exit(EXIT_SUCCESS);
}

XCB has a comparable, but slightly lower-level API than Xlib, as can be seen with this example.

Protocol description
Creators of XCB have invented a specialized interface description language to model X11 protocol in language-neutral way and facilitate generation of bindings to other programming languages. libxcb itself is implemented as a code generator and a tiny C stub of utility functions.

An example:
<xcb header="bigreq" extension-xname="BIG-REQUESTS"
    extension-name="BigRequests" extension-multiword="true"
    major-version="0" minor-version="0">

  <request name="Enable" opcode="0">
    <reply>
      <pad bytes="1" />
      <field type="CARD32" name="maximum_request_length" />
    </reply>
  </request>
</xcb>

Logo
The XCB logo was produced by Gearóid Molloy, author of the web comic Neko the Kitty, and donated to the project.

Other language bindings
 XCB.pm - Perl module implementing bindings to XCB.
 xpyb - The Python binding to the X Window System using XCB. As of June 2013, it does not support Python 3. Provided by freedesktop.org.
 xcffib - Another Python binding which supports Python 2 & 3 as well as several more X extensions than xpyb.

Notes

References

External links

 XCB wiki (freedesktop.org)
 XCB API reference, tutorial
 libxcb tutorial
 Further publications
 The X New Developer’s Guide: Xlib and XCB

C (programming language) libraries
Freedesktop.org
Freedesktop.org libraries
Software using the MIT license
X Window System